Calvary Lutheran Church and Parsonage is a historic church building and parsonage in Silverton, Oregon, United States. The church is also known as the First Christian Church. The church is a combination of the Carpenter Gothic and the Queen Anne architectural styles. The parsonage is Bungalow/Craftsman and Greek Revival style.

Originally, the church was known as the First Christian Church.  In 1906, the church building became the Norwegian Lutheran Church and in 1926-1927 it was remodeled to its current configuration. The church was sold in 1975, and in 1984, it became the White Steeple Gallery and Tea Room, a name by which it was still known in 1992.

The church, a balloon frame  building built during 1891-92, is Gothic Revival in style, with Eastlake ornamentation. It was moved to a new location on a raised foundation on the same tax lot in the 1920s.  The parsonage, built in 1926, is a one-and-a-half-story bungalow.  The property includes a non-contributing parson's study, a one-story detached building built between 1953 and 1956, behind the church.

The church and parsonage buildings were listed on the National Register of Historic Places in 1985.

See also
National Register of Historic Places listings in Marion County, Oregon

References

External links

Images of Calvary Lutheran Church from the University of Oregon Library Digital Collections

1891 establishments in Oregon
19th-century Lutheran churches in the United States
American Craftsman architecture in Oregon
Bungalow architecture in Oregon
Carpenter Gothic church buildings in Oregon
Churches completed in 1891
Churches in Marion County, Oregon
Greek Revival houses in Oregon
Lutheran churches in Oregon
National Register of Historic Places in Marion County, Oregon
Norwegian-American culture in Oregon
Silverton, Oregon